Lutz Ulbricht (9 November 1942 – 23 December 2022) was a competition rower and Olympic champion for West Germany. He was born in Berlin. Ulbricht won a gold medal in men's eight at the 1968 Summer Olympics in Mexico City, as a member of the rowing team from West Germany.

References

External links
 

1942 births
2022 deaths
Rowers from Berlin
Olympic rowers of West Germany
Rowers at the 1968 Summer Olympics
Rowers at the 1972 Summer Olympics
Olympic gold medalists for West Germany
Olympic medalists in rowing
West German male rowers
World Rowing Championships medalists for West Germany
Medalists at the 1968 Summer Olympics
European Rowing Championships medalists